Hansuli Banker Upakatha (first published: 1951) is a novel by Tarashankar Bandopadhyay, set in 1941. The novel explores life in rural Bengal, the realities of the Zamindari system that was responsible for much of the social inequalities in Bengal, as well as the changes in social perceptions with time.

The novel was written and published in various versions between 1946 and 1951. In 1946, it was first appeared in a shorter version in a special annual Durga festival issue of Anandabazar Patrika. Later, the novel was expanded and revised over the following
five years, appearing in several editions during that time.

The novel was translated into English as The Tale of Hansuli Turn by Ben Conisbee Baer, published 2011.

Plot summary

The plot is divided into 6 parts.

Adaptation 
Hasuli Banker Upakatha (film) was made in 1962 by Tapan Sinha based on this novel.

References

Indian novels adapted into films
1951 novels
Fiction set in 1941
Novels set in Bengal
Indian Bengali-language novels
1951 Indian novels